Wong Chun-hun (born 30 October 1995; also known as Kevin Wong) is a Hong Kong tennis player.

Wong has a career high ATP singles ranking of 965 achieved on 21 May 2018 and a career high ATP doubles ranking of 661, achieved on 25 June 2018.

Wong has represented Hong Kong at the Davis Cup, where he has a win–loss record of 7–3.

External links

Wong Chun-hun at University of Michigan

1995 births
Living people
Hong Kong male tennis players
Michigan Wolverines men's tennis players
Tennis players at the 2014 Asian Games
Tennis players at the 2018 Asian Games
Universiade medalists in tennis
Universiade medalists for Hong Kong
Asian Games competitors for Hong Kong
Medalists at the 2017 Summer Universiade